Andriy Vladimirovich Vatseba (Russian: Андрей Вацеба; born 7 December 1995) is a Ukrainian football midfielder.

Career

As a youth player, Vatseba joined the youth academy of Dynamo (Kyiv), Ukraine's most successful club.

Before the second half of 2013/14, he signed for Resovia in the Polish fourth division.

Before the 2015 season, he signed for Ukrainian lower league side Nika (Ivano-Frankivsk).

In 2016, Vatseba signed for Arka Gdynia in the Polish top flight.

Before the second half of 2016/17, he was sent on loan to Polish third division team Gryf Wejherowo.

Before the 2019 season, he signed for Arameisk-Syrianska in the Swedish fourth division.

Before the second half of 2019/20, Vatseba signed for Ukrainian second division outfit Prykarpattia.

References

External links

 

Ukrainian footballers
Arameisk-Syrianska IF players
Division 2 (Swedish football) players
Living people
Association football midfielders
Expatriate footballers in Poland
Ukrainian expatriate sportspeople in Sweden
Ukrainian expatriate sportspeople in Poland
1995 births
Resovia (football) players
FC Nyva Ternopil players
II liga players
FC Prykarpattia Ivano-Frankivsk (1998) players
Gryf Wejherowo players
Ukrainian expatriate footballers
Expatriate footballers in Sweden
Sportspeople from Ivano-Frankivsk